Jean-Louis Bonnard (b. 1 March 1824 at Saint-Christôt-en-Jarret, Diocese of Lyon; beheaded 1 May 1852) was a French Roman Catholic missionary to Vietnam, one of the Martyrs of Vietnam, canonized in 1988.

Life

After a collegiate course at Saint-Jodard, he entered the seminary of Lyon. He left at the age of 22, to complete his theological studies at the Seminary of the Foreign Missions in Paris.

From Nantes, where he was ordained, he sailed for the missions of Western Tongking (northern Vietnam) and reached there in May, 1850. In 1851 he was put in charge of two parishes there. At the time, proselytisation was banned in Vietnam.

On 21 March 1852, he was arrested and cast into prison. Sentence of death was pronounced against him and was executed immediately upon receipt of its confirmation by Emperor Tự Đức (1 May 1852). His remains were thrown into the river, but recovered by Christians and sent by them to the Seminary of Foreign Missions.

References

Launay, Les cinguante-deux serviteurs de Dieu (Paris, 1895), 355–373.

Notes

External links
Saint Joseph Abbey page
 Archives of the Paris Foreign Missions Society 

1824 births
1852 deaths
1852 in Vietnam
Paris Foreign Missions Society missionaries
People executed by Vietnam by decapitation
19th-century Christian saints
French Roman Catholic missionaries
French Roman Catholic saints
Vietnamese Roman Catholic saints
19th-century French people
French people executed abroad
19th-century executions by Vietnam
People from Loire (department)
Executed people from Rhône-Alpes
Roman Catholic missionaries in Vietnam
French expatriates in Vietnam